Miel van Leijden (1885 – 1949) was a Dutch male footballer. He was part of the Netherlands national football team, playing 1 match on 16 October 1910.

See also
 List of Dutch international footballers

References

1885 births
1949 deaths
Dutch footballers
Netherlands international footballers
People from Batavia, Dutch East Indies
Association football defenders